Adult Contemporary is a chart published by Billboard ranking the top-performing songs in the United States in the adult contemporary music (AC) market.  In 1992, 19 songs topped the chart, then published under the title Hot Adult Contemporary, based on playlists submitted by radio stations.

At the start of the year, Richard Marx was at number one with "Keep Coming Back", retaining a position which the song had occupied at the end of 1991.  The track topped the chart for the first two weeks of 1992 before being displaced by Mariah Carey's "Can't Let Go".  Marx and Carey were among several acts to achieve two chart-toppers in 1992, along with Michael Bolton, Celine Dion and Elton John, who topped the chart with his solo single "The One" and also made a guest appearance on George Michael's version of "Don't Let the Sun Go Down on Me", which John himself had originally recorded in 1974.  John's "The One" had the year's longest unbroken run at number one, spending six weeks in the top spot, and the British singer tied with Bolton for the highest total number of weeks atop the chart by an artist, each spending eight weeks at number one.  Two of 1992's number ones originated as performances on the MTV Unplugged television series: Carey's rendition of "I'll Be There", originally performed by the Jackson 5, and Eric Clapton's "Tears in Heaven".

The final number one of the year was "I Will Always Love You" by Whitney Houston, from the soundtrack of the film The Bodyguard, in which she starred.  The song held the top spot for the final two weeks of 1992.  It was among three of 1992's Hot Adult Contemporary number ones to also top Billboards all-genre chart, the Hot 100, along with "Don't Let the Sun Go Down on Me" and "Save the Best for Last" by Vanessa Williams, which was a triple chart-topper as it also reached the top spot on the Hot Soul Singles (now Hot R&B/Hip-Hop Songs) listing.  Williams had achieved previous number ones on that chart, but "Save the Best for Last" was her first AC chart-topper.  Michael W. Smith, a successful singer in the contemporary Christian music genre since the early 1980s, gained his first Hot Adult Contemporary number one with "I Will Be Here for You".  Patty Smyth, the former lead singer of the rock group Scandal, was also a first-time AC chart-topper in 1992 with "Sometimes Love Just Ain't Enough", a duet with Don Henley.

Chart history

References

See also
1992 in music
List of artists who reached number one on the U.S. Adult Contemporary chart

1992
1992 record charts
1992 in American music